St. John Township may refer to the following places in the United States:

 St. John Township, Lake County, Indiana, in Lake County
 St. John Township, Stafford County, Kansas, in Kansas
 St. John Township, New Madrid County, Missouri, in Missouri

See also
 St. Johns Township (disambiguation)

Township name disambiguation pages